The Office of Information and Regulatory Affairs (OIRA  ) is a Division within the Office of Management and Budget (OMB), which in turn, is within the Executive Office of the President. OIRA oversees the implementation of government-wide policies in, and reviews draft regulations under, Executive Order 12866, the Paperwork Reduction Act, and the Information Quality Act.

Tasks
OIRA reviews draft rules that it receives from federal agencies under the three laws noted in the preamble to this article, and develops and oversees the implementation of government-wide policies in the areas of information technology, information policy, privacy, and statistical policy.

As one step in the entire rulemaking process (as explained in more detail in United States administrative law), OIRA reviews draft rules and regulations under 12866 from 1993. Executive Order 12866 describes OIRA's role in the rulemaking process and directs agencies to follow certain principles, such as consideration of alternatives and analysis of impacts, both benefits and costs. OIRA reviews draft regulations to ensure agency compliance with this executive order.

History and jurisdiction

Cost/benefit analysis—Executive Order 12866 and its predecessors
Presidential regulatory principles and the centralized review of draft regulations had been part of U.S. regulatory development for decades. President Nixon's "Quality of Life" program involved such review, and President Ford's  in 1974 required agencies to prepare inflation/economic impact statements. 

A predecessor office had existed at Office of Management and Budget, OMB, an agency within the Executive Office of the President for many years; from 1977 to 1981, it was briefly at the Department of Commerce. It continued with President Jimmy Carter's  on "Improving Government Regulations."

Today, about 20% of all regulations flow through OIRA for cost-benefit regulatory review under Executive Order 12866.

Paperwork Reduction Act, 1981
The Congress passed the Paperwork Reduction Act of 1980 and its successor, the Paperwork Reduction Act of 1995, that established OIRA in the OMB. 

The OMB review process became more formalized in 1981 with President Ronald Reagan's . During his administration, the White House had reviewed 2,000 to 3,000 regulations per year. It continued during the George H. W. Bush Administration and the first nine months of the Clinton administration.

In September 1993, President Bill Clinton issued , and the total dropped to between 500 and 700 annually. 
The executive order states OIRA should focus on "economically significant" rules. Of the 500 to 700 rules reviewed by OIRA annually, about 100 have been classified as "economically significant". In 1995, the Paperwork Reduction Act was updated.

In January 2007, President George W. Bush signed , which changed the rules as of July 24, 2007. The Executive Order covers federal agencies' "guidance documents", in addition to regulations. Its stated purpose was to ensure that agencies comply with the regulatory principles stated in Executive Order 12866 and that the President's policies are reflected in agency rules. It also specified procedures for the resolution of conflicts between or among agencies. In July 2007, controversy arose in the U.S. Congress over this order giving the OIRA additional powers. The House of Representatives voted to prohibit OIRA from spending federal money on Executive Order 13422.

In January 2011, President Barack Obama issued Executive Order 13563 to improve regulation and regulatory review.

OIRA guides and coordinates agencies with respect to Circular A4, Information Quality Guidelines, and the Bulletin for Agency Good Guidance Practices.

Organization
The office has five branches:
 Food, Health, and Labor Branch  
 Information Policy Branch 
 Natural Resources and Environment Branch
 Statistical & Science Policy Branch
 Transportation and Security Branch

Administrators

Criticism
A 2011 report from the Center on Progressive Reform stated that in 10 years, OIRA altered 84 percent of EPA rule submissions.
The EPA's new rules on ozone pollution developed since September 2009, rolled out as tougher draft standards in January 2010, were repeatedly delayed.

See also 
 Council on Wage and Price Stability

References

External links

Regulatory Information Service Center in the Federal Register
RegInfo: Where to find Federal Regulatory Information
Archive of U.S. Executive Orders
What is OIRA? thecre.com
History OMB Regulatory Review
The White House Transitions Project’s Insider’s Guide to OMB
The Office of Information and Regulatory Affairs and the durability of regulatory oversight in the United States. By Susan E. Dudley for Regulation & Governance, 20 July, 2020.

Government agencies established in 1980
Information and Regulatory Affairs